Polzer is a surname. Notable people with the surname include:

Heinz Hermann Polzer (1919–2015), Swiss singer-songwriter, poet, and prose writer
Jeffrey T. Polzer, American academic
Leopold Innocenty Nepomucen Polzer (1697–1753), Polish lawyer

See also
Holzer
Pozzer